Aaron Bridgers (January 10, 1918 – November 3, 2003) was an American jazz pianist who moved to Paris, in 1947. Bridgers was jazz composer Billy Strayhorn's lover from 1939 until Bridgers's move to France.

Bridgers is featured in the Paul Newman film Paris Blues (1961).

References

External links
 
 *See Jazz in Paris with Aaron Bridgers and Art Simmons in The Living Room

1918 births
2003 deaths
American jazz pianists
American male pianists
LGBT African Americans
American gay musicians
20th-century American pianists
LGBT people from North Carolina
20th-century American male musicians
American male jazz musicians
20th-century American LGBT people
21st-century American LGBT people
20th-century African-American musicians